Douglas Denoff (born July 14, 1957) is a seven-time Tony Award-Nominated Broadway theatre producer, writer and entrepreneur. He has won the Drama Desk Award as a producer and television's Emmy Award, and, in 2012 received his first Grammy Award nomination. Through his company Sutton Square Entertainment, he develops and produces original new musicals and plays that can be successful on Broadway, and in regional theatres and touring companies.

Career
Denoff is a coproducer of the return engagement of Take Me Out which won the 2022 Tony Award for Best Play Revival.   Denoff was represented on Broadway in 2019 as a co-producer of Slave Play by Jeremy O. Harris.  Denoff also co-produced Sea Wall/A Life starring Jake Gyllenhaal and Tom Sturridge, which recouped its entire investment within its limited 9-week run at the Hudson Theatre. Both plays received Tony nominations for Best Play.  Slave Play returned in 2021 for a limited run at the August Wilson Theatre.

Denoff was a co-producer of the hit new musical Pretty Woman which opened August 16, 2018 and ran until August 18, 2019. Pretty Woman continued around the world with productions in Hamburg in 2019, London beginning February 2020 and a North American tour in 2020.

Denoff is the lead producer of the new Broadway musical entertainment, That's Broadway! The Moves, The Music, The Magic, directed by Tony-winner Jerry Mitchell - a celebration of Broadway's best song and dance numbers with original choreography  recreated by the collaborators of American Dance Machine for the 21st Century. The show will open on Broadway in 2023 followed by tours in North American and international markets.  Denoff is lead producer of The Lucky Star, by Karen Hartman, which made its NY debut at 59E59 theatres in Spring 2022 and will transfer to Broadway in 2023-2024.  Denoff is producing Lulu, an adaptation of the plays Earth Spirit and Pandora's Box by Frank Wedekind (author of Spring Awakening). He is also producing the stage adaptation written and directed by Teunkie Van Der Sluijs of the film Interview, originally directed by Theo Van Gogh and then remade by Steve Buscemi.

In the 2018–2019 season Denoff received his fifth Tony nomination for co-producing the critically acclaimed revival of Harvey Fierstein's Torch Song on Broadway at the Second Stage Theater, which ran through January 6, 2019. The critically acclaimed play starred Michael Urie and Mercedes Ruehl and was directed by Moisés Kaufman.

Denoff also co-produced the new play American Son by Christopher Demos-Brown. The 16-week limited engagement starred Kerry Washington, Stephen Pasquale, Eugene Lee, and Jeremy Jordan, and was directed by Kenny Leon. American Son ran from November 4, 2018, through January 27, 2019, and was then adapted for film by Netflix.

Denoff was represented on Broadway in 2017–2018 as a co-producer of John Leguizamo's Latin History For Morons, for which he received his 4th Tony nomination and which recouped its investment in 14.5 weeks. John Leguizamo was also awarded a Special Tony Award for his body of work.

Denoff was represented on Broadway in 2016 as a co-producer of the hit revival of Fiddler On The Roof at the Broadway Theatre, for which he received his third Tony nomination as a coproducer, and also co-produced David Mamet’s China Doll starring Al Pacino.

Denoff was a lead producer in 2015 of the hit play Clever Little Lies by two-time Tony winner Joe DiPietro. The play, directed by David Saint, starred Emmy, Grammy and Golden Globe winner Marlo Thomas, Greg Mullavey, Kate Wetherhead, and George Merrick. Denoff supported the 2013 Tony Award-winning Best Play, Vanya and Sonia and Masha and Spike, and received his second Tony nomination as a co-producer of the 2012 musical Nice Work If You Can Get It, starring Matthew Broderick and Kelli O'Hara.

Denoff received his first Tony nomination in 2008 as a producer of The 39 Steps, the hit comedy which ran over three years and 1135 performances on Broadway; the longest-running play in over 7 years.  Denoff was lead producer on the hit revival of 39 Steps, which began performances at the Union Square Theatre on April 1, 2015, and ran until the theatres’ closing on January 3, 2016.

He was lead producer of Handle With Care, the romantic comedy by Emmy®-nominated author Jason Odell Williams, starring the legendary Tony nominee Carol Lawrence, directed by Karen Carpenter (Love, Loss, and What I Wore). It had an extended run at the Westside Theatre in 2012–2013, and is now being licensed worldwide. Denoff also produced Carpenter's production of the new play Witnessed By The World at 59E59.

He is also producing Latin Roots – a musical celebration of Desi Arnaz and his orchestra, starring Lucie Arnaz and the New Desi Arnaz Orchestra.

In 2012, Denoff co-produced the Grammy-nominated Original Cast Album of Nice Work If You Can Get It as the launch release of his new record label Shout! Broadway, in partnership with Shout! Factory. In 2013 they produced the 2012 Broadway cast album of Annie along with 12-time Grammy-winning album producer Thomas Z. Shepard, and have released the cast recording of Scandalous and several notable solo albums.

Denoff began his entertainment career in 1977 as the Assistant to the Producers of the original long-running CBS television series Hawaii Five-O, ultimately working as the Associate Producer overseeing post-production.

In 1980 he worked as the line producer of the ABC Television film A Time For Miracles, and then secured the rights to a front-page story that was to become an NBC Movie. The 1981 Writers' Guild strike put all productions on hold for over one year. While working from home in the era before call-waiting and needing multiple phone lines, he salvaged an unused multi-line phone system for his own use. Months later, he was asked if he could install a similar system for another businessman, and subsequently formed one of the early telephone interconnect companies, Dencom Systems, Inc.; installing business phone systems for commercial clients in the Los Angeles area. The company gained prominence by guaranteeing 1-hour emergency service response 24 hours a day. It assumed the service contracts of a number of much larger competitors who left the industry. Recognized several times by Inc. Magazine as one of the 500 fastest-growing companies in the US, Dencom grew to over 20 employees in Santa Monica. In 1992, Denoff learned that long-distance services could be re-sold and formed an affiliated company, Fibernet, Inc. to resell the long-distance services of major carriers and provide clear, integrated monthly statements. By offering discounts on the telephone systems to Dencom customers in return for term contracts on the monthly long-distance services, Fibernet quickly became a flourishing business.

In 2003, however, Denoff began to downsize the companies in preparation for his long-desired relocation back to New York City, and a return to a creative career.

Personal life
Denoff resides in New York City and is a Member of The Broadway League (www.broadwayleague.com ), The Academy of Television Arts & Sciences and The Recording Academy.

Denoff is the son of television writer/producer Sam Denoff and his first wife Bernice Levey. He has one full sister Leslie, and two half siblings, Melissa and Matthew, from his father's second marriage to dancer Sharon Shore. He was born in New York City attended nursery school at the Hunter College Elementary School. His family moved to Los Angeles at the age of 4 1/2. He grew up in Beverly Hills, attending El Rodeo Elementary School and Beverly Hills High School, where he worked in the theatre department; building sets and running lights for the schools' musicals and plays. He attended UCLA, majoring in English and Computer Science.

References

https://www.ibdb.com/broadway-cast-staff/douglas-denoff-477363
http://www.imdb.com/name/nm1010179/?ref_=fn_al_nm_1

1957 births
American theatre people
Living people
Drama Desk Award winners
Emmy Award winners